The 1982 Winfield State League was the inaugural season of the Queensland Rugby League's statewide competition. The competition was run similarly to the NSWRL's Amco Cup, featuring a short format prior the larger Brisbane Premiership season. The Easts Tigers won the title with a 23-15 win over Redcliffe in the final at Lang Park in Brisbane.

Teams 
A total of 14 teams competed in the inaugural season, 8 of which were BRL Premiership clubs. The remaining six were regional teams from across the state, hence the State League name.

Ladder 
Redcliffe, Easts, Wests and Souths made the finals from a 7-round season. All 8 Brisbane clubs finished above their country counterparts on the ladder.

Source:

Finals 
The finals were straight final four series held at QRL headquarters at Lang Park, with Easts and Redcliffe winning their respective semi finals. In the final, the Tigers outclassed the Dolphins 23-15 to win the inaugural Winfield State League.

References

Rugby league in Brisbane
Winfield State League season